Jimmy Jowett was an English greyhound trainer. He was the British champion trainer.

Career
His first success was the 1939 Metropolitan Cup. Before the War he was a private trainer before taking up a position at Belle Vue Stadium in 1946. He soon returned to private training in 1947 and was based at Grappenhall in Warrington.

1950 he won the Scottish Greyhound Derby and one year later he joined Clapton Stadium Ltd and trained at Warrington where he quickly established himself as the leading trainer. After this spell at Warrington, he joined Clapton in 1952 and was based at the Hook Estate and Kennels, Northaw. He won the Scurry Gold Cup four times, twice with Gorey Airways. 

Jowett retired one year before Clapton closed in 1974.

Awards
He was the winner of the Greyhound Trainer of the Year in 1961.

References 

British greyhound racing trainers